Sir Rupert Horace Myers,  (21 February 1921 – 21 February 2019) was an Australian metallurgist, academic and university administrator, who was the third vice-chancellor of the University of New South Wales from 1969 to 1981. He was the second person to be awarded a PhD by an Australian University. He died on 21 February 2019 on his 98th birthday.

Honours
In the New Year Honours of 1976, Myers was appointed a Commander of the Order of the British Empire for his work as Vice-Chancellor of the University of New South Wales. He was further recognised for his "service to education, science and the community" on being knighted as a Knight Commander of the Order of the British Empire In the Queen's Birthday Honours of 1981 and, in the Australia Day Honours of 1995, he was appointed an Officer of the Order of Australia for his efforts in promoting "innovation and commerce in the fields of science technology and engineering." On 1 January 2001, he was awarded the Centenary Medal for his "service to Australian society and science."

References

1921 births
2019 deaths
Australian Army personnel of World War II
Australian corporate directors
Australian Knights Commander of the Order of the British Empire
Australian metallurgists
Fellows of the Australian Academy of Science
Fellows of the Australian Academy of Technological Sciences and Engineering
Officers of the Order of Australia
People from Melbourne
Recipients of the Centenary Medal
University of Melbourne alumni
Vice-Chancellors of the University of New South Wales